Ophyx striata is a moth of the family Erebidae first described by George Hampson in 1926. It is found in Papua, Indonesia, where it has only been recorded from Fakfak, the type locality.

References

Ophyx
Moths described in 1926
Moths of Indonesia